Margaret Mhango Mwanakatwe is a Zambian politician who was the Minister of Finance from 14 February 2018 to 14 July 2019. She worked previously as a businesswoman, accountant, and bank executive. She was the director for business development in Anglophone Africa at the United Bank for Africa at the bank's headquarters in Lagos, Nigeria. In this role, she supervised business development in Cameroon, the Democratic Republic of the Congo, Ghana, Kenya, Liberia, Mozambique, Tanzania, Uganda, and Zambia. Before that, she served as the managing director and chief executive officer of the United Bank for Africa Uganda Limited from March 2009 until May 2011.

Overview
Mwanakatwe is a business executive and banker, with a professional career spanning over twenty years. She has been a banking chief executive in her native Zambia, Ghana, and Uganda and a senior executive at the United Bank for Africa (UBA) in Nigeria.

Background and education
She was born in Northern Rhodesia on 1 November 1961. She holds a Bachelor of Business Administration degree. She is also a Chartered Certified Accountant, recognized by the Association of Chartered Certified Accountants of London.

Career
Following education both in Zambia and abroad, she took up employment at Barclays Bank of Zambia (now Absa Bank Zambia Plc). She rose to the position of managing director. She was the first Zambian and first female chief executive at Barclays Bank of Zambia. She was also the first woman CEO in all of Barclays Bank's African subsidiaries at the time. In 2004, she was appointed managing director and CEO at Barclays Bank of Ghana, serving in that capacity until 2009.

In 2009, she left Barclays Bank and joined the UBA as managing director and chief executive at UBA Bank Uganda. During the same timeframe, she served as the regional business director for southern Africa for UBA. In 2011, she left UBA Uganda and transferred to the headquarters of UBA in Lagos, Nigeria as the director for business development in Anglophone Africa.

Politics
On 2 February 2015, Mwanakatwe was nominated Member of Parliament and appointed Minister of Commerce by Zambia President Edgar Lungu. She was elected as Member of Parliament for Lusaka Central Constituency, which was previously held by Guy Scott.

On 4 February 2018, in  a cabinet reshuffle, she was appointed Minister of Finance. With the Zambian economy struggling a number of key projects have stalled, Mwanakatwe's extensive experience in banking provides her with relatively reasonable experience to add value to the Ministry of Finance, restore investor confidence and to create new economic partners. In her role as Minister of Finance, Mwanakatwe tasked her department to work effectively in order to ensure that the ministry satisfies the expectations of the electorate.

In  a meeting held on 20 February 2018, the minister requested that her team formulate a plan to offset domestic arrears in a systemic manner. Additionally, in this meeting she directed officials to formulate a sustainable plan to pay salaries to public service workers on time and commended the team for its commitment to improving domestic resource mobilisation.

She was relieved of her duties as Finance Minister by President Lungu on 14 July 2019.

Family
Margaret Mwanakatwe is married to Mupanga Mwanakatwe, who serves as the managing director of Zamtel, the state-owned telecommunications company.

See also
 List of banks in Nigeria
 List of banks in Uganda
 List of banks in Zambia

References

External links
 Overview of Margaret Mwanakatwe's Work In Ghana

1961 births
Living people
Zambian businesspeople
Zambian bankers
Zambian accountants
Women accountants
Finance Ministers of Zambia
Women government ministers of Zambia
21st-century Zambian women politicians
21st-century Zambian politicians
Zambian women in business
Female finance ministers
University of Zambia alumni
Commerce, Trade and Industry ministers of Zambia
Zambian women chief executives
Zambian business executives
Members of the National Assembly of Zambia
Zambian chief executives